J.J. Dossett is an American teacher, Oklahoma Air National Guard veteran, and politician who served as a member of the Oklahoma Senate from the 34th district from 2016 to 2022. He was first elected in November 2015 and  assumed office on January 21, 2016.

Early life and education 
J.J. Dossett grew up in Owasso, Oklahoma where his father was  principal of Owasso High School for 29 years and his mother taught swimming and elementary special education.
He graduated from Owasso High School in 2002 and earned a Bachelor of Arts degree in history education from Oklahoma State University in 2006.

Military service and teaching career
Dossett served in the Oklahoma Air National Guard and reached the rank of master sergeant. He served in the 138th Fighter Wing and was deployed in Iraq and Afghanistan.

After his military service, Dossett returned to Owasso. He was hired to teach world history and medieval history at Owasso High School and assistant coached the basketball team.

Oklahoma Senate
In 2016, Dossett ran in a special election to replace the former district 34 State Senator, Republican Rick Brinkley, who had pled guilty to embezzlement and resigned. 
Dossett defeated Republican David McLain in the November election becoming the first Democrat elected in the district since 1990. He was sworn in on January 21, 2016. Dossett was the Minority Whip from 2017 to 2018.

In 2018, Dossett ran for a full term and won unopposed. From 2018 to 2022, he was the assistant Democratic floor leader. In 2020, Dossett's sister Jo Anna Dossett was also elected to the Oklahoma Senate. In his last term, Dossett was the only Democratic Senator who consistently voted for anti-abortion legislation. In 2022, he lost his reelection campaign to far-right Republican Dana Prieto.

Personal life 
Dossett lives in Owasso, Oklahoma, with his wife and their three children.

Electoral history

2016

2018
In the 2018 election for the District 34 State Senate seat, Dossett was unopposed in both the Democratic primary and the general election.

2022

References 

Living people
Democratic Party Oklahoma state senators
Oklahoma State University alumni
People from Owasso, Oklahoma
Year of birth missing (living people)
21st-century American politicians